Jesús Lázaro Owono Ngua Akeng (born 1 March 2001) is an Equatoguinean professional footballer who plays as a goalkeeper for Segunda División club Deportivo Alavés and the Equatorial Guinea national team.

Early life
Owono was born in Bata and moved to the Basque Country, Spain during his childhood. He joined Antiguoko at age 8. He represented the Basque Country at under–16 level.

Club career
Owono made his La Liga debut for Alavés on 2 January 2022. He is the first Equatorial Guinea international footballer born in the country to appear in a Spanish top-league match.

International career
Owono, at the age of 17, received his first senior call up by Equatorial Guinea in September 2018. He made his debut on 25 March 2019, playing the whole second half of a 2–3 friendly loss to Saudi Arabia.

Career statistics

Club

International

References

External links

2001 births
Living people
People from Bata, Equatorial Guinea
Footballers from the Basque Country (autonomous community)
Fang people
Equatoguinean emigrants to Spain
Naturalised citizens of Spain
Equatoguinean footballers
Spanish footballers
Association football goalkeepers
Antiguoko players
Real Sociedad footballers
Deportivo Alavés B players
Deportivo Alavés players
Tercera División players
Tercera Federación players
La Liga players
Equatorial Guinea international footballers
2021 Africa Cup of Nations players